Franciscodendron is a monotypic genus in the subfamily Sterculioideae  (previously the family Sterculiaceae) within the family Malvaceae. The single species, Franciscodendron laurifolium, commonly known as tulip sterculia, tulip kurrajong or cabbage crowsfoot, is a tree native to Australia.

References

Sterculioideae
Malvaceae genera
Trees of Australia
Flora of Queensland
Malvales of Australia
Monotypic Malvales genera
Taxa named by Bernard Hyland
Taxa named by Cornelis Gijsbert Gerrit Jan van Steenis